Flash Traffic: City of Angels is a game developed by Tsunami Games and published by Time Warner Interactive for DOS systems in 1994.

Plot 
The DEA hit a warehouse, where they kill two people and take three suspects. They believe the warehouse only contains drugs, but find the materials to make a nuclear bomb.  The player is tasked to find out who made the bomb, retrieve it, and defuse it before it destroys the Northern Hempsphere.

Gameplay 
When a scene ends, players are given three choices on how to proceed. They impact the story and gameplay, but the wrong choice does not usually end the game.  However, some choices can result in the player's death.

Release 
Tsunami Games debuted the game at COMDEX in November 1994.

Reception 
Entertainment Weekly rated it C+ and said "An uninspiring script and so-so acting make Flash Traffic play like a direct-to-video cheapie with a multiple-personality disorder."  Stephen Manes of The New York Times called it "stronger on acting and dialogue than on plot".  Manes said some choices do not seem to affect the plot, making it unsatisfying.

References

External links 
 

1994 video games
DOS games
DOS-only games
Interactive movie video games
Single-player video games
Tsunami Games games
Video games about police officers
Video games developed in the United States